Paludicella articulata is a species of freshwater moss animal in the genus Paludicella.

Description
They have chitin shine that is similar to the beetles shield. The color is brown. Their life cycle is usually a few months.

Habitat
The species live in a colony, which always grow on a place where they are sheltered from silt.

Bibliography 
 Økland, K. A., & Økland, J. (2000) Freshwater bryozoans (Bryozoa) of Norway: distribution and ecology of Cristatella mucedo and Paludicella articulata. Hydrobiologia, 421(1), 1–24 (résumé).

References

Ctenostomatida
Animals described in 1831
Taxa named by Christian Gottfried Ehrenberg